Mohamed Mohamed Habib (c. 1914 – December 2007) was an Egyptian basketball player. He competed in the men's tournament at the 1948 Summer Olympics.

References

1910s births
2007 deaths
Egyptian men's basketball players
Olympic basketball players of Egypt
Basketball players at the 1948 Summer Olympics
Place of birth missing